Helsinki-class missile boat is a class of four fast attack craft built for the Finnish Navy. All the ships were constructed at the Wärtsilä Helsinki Shipyard, Finland, and had Pansio as their homeport.

Service 
The vessels were designed as fast attack crafts, but designated "missile boats" in the Finnish Navy, as to tone down their offensive capabilities. They were armed with up to eight RBS-15 SSMs, one dual-purpose Bofors 57 mm gun, two SAKO 23 mm double-barreled anti-aircraft guns and two depth charge racks.

During the late 1990s, the class was due to undergo a mid-life upgrade through 2006–2008 but this was rejected because of budget constraints. The ships were decommissioned from Finnish service, and Helsinki and Turku were used for testing purposes before they were scrapped in 2011.

Two of the vessels were sold to the Croatian Navy for a symbolic price of €9 million (65 million kuna) as a part of an off-set deal for the previous Croatian purchase of 126 Patria AMV vehicles.

The ships arrived in Croatia on 2 November 2008. They underwent a basic refit and repainting, and entered service in January 2009. According to current plans the ships are scheduled to stay active until 2020–2022.

Ships

References

External links

 

Missile boat classes
Ships built in Finland
Missile boats of the Finnish Navy
Missile boats of the Croatian Navy